List of the National Register of Historic Places listings in Sullivan County, New York

This is intended to be a complete list of properties and districts listed on the National Register of Historic Places in Sullivan County, New York.  The locations of National Register properties and districts showing latitude and longitude coordinates may be seen in a map by clicking on "Map of all coordinates".  The Delaware and Hudson Canal, which runs through this and other counties, is further designated a U.S. National Historic Landmark.



Listings county-wide

|}

References

Sullivan County